A bread pan, also called a loaf pan, is a kitchen utensil in the form of a container in which bread is baked. Its function is to shape bread while it is rising during baking. The most common shape of the bread pan is the loaf, or narrow rectangle, a convenient form that enables uniform slicing. The bread pan is made from a conductive material such as metal which might be treated with a non-stick coating. It can also be made of heat-resistant glass, ceramic, or a special type of paper that sticks to the dough but is easily removed, once cooked. Bread pans are found in a variety of designs and sizes providing the baker with different possibilities not only for baking bread, but also cakes and puddings. 

Types of bread typically baked in bread pans include sandwich breads, brioche, challah, and raisin bread.

See also
 Cake pan
 List of cooking vessels
 Proofing
 Pullman loaf, type of square slicing bread, made with a lidded bread pan 

Cookware and bakeware